Dayna Stephens (born August 1, 1978) is an American jazz saxophonist and composer. In addition to leading his own group, Stephens has performed extensively with Kenny Barron, Ambrose Akinmusire, Taylor Eigsti, Julian Lage, Eric Harland, and Gerald Clayton. Stephens grew up in the San Francisco Bay Area and attended Berkeley High School. He went on to study at the Berklee School of Music and later at the Thelonious Monk Institute of Jazz.

Stephens's albums include The Timeless Now (2007), Today Is Tomorrow (2012), That Nepenthetic Place (2013), I'll Take My Chances (2013), and Peace (2014). Peace features guitarist Julian Lage, pianist Brad Mehldau, bassist Larry Grenadier, and drummer Eric Harland. Gratitude was released in 2017.

Discography

As leader
 The Timeless Now (CTA, 2007)
 A Week Ago Today (Prophone, 2011)
 Today Is Tomorrow (Criss Cross, 2012)
 I'll Take My Chances (Criss Cross, 2013)
 That Nepenthetic Place (Sunnyside, 2013)
 Peace (Sunnyside, 2014)
 New Day (Vegamusic, 2014)
 Reminiscent (Criss Cross, 2015)
 Gratitude (Contagious Music, 2017)
 Right Now! (Contagious Music, 2020)
 Liberty (Contagious Music, 2020)

As sideman
 Kenny Barron, Concentric Circles (Blue Note, 2018)
 David Berkman, Old Friends and New Friends (Palmetto, 2015)
 David Berkman, Six Of One (Palmetto, 2019)
 Massimo Biolcati, Incontre (Sounderscore, 2020)
 Gerald Clayton, Life Forum (Concord Jazz, 2013)
 Gerald Clayton, Tributary Tales (Motema, 2017)
 Joe Cohn, Marathon Man (Vegamusic, 2014)
 Dan Cray, Outside In (Origin, 2016)
 Al Foster, Inspirations & Dedications (Smoke Sessions, 2019)
 Danny Grissett, Remembrance (Savant, 2017)
 Allison Miller, Science Fair (Sunnyside, 2018)
 Linda Oh, Initial Here (Greenleaf Music, 2012)
 Gretchen Parlato, The Lost and Found (Obliqsound, 2011)
 Phil Ranelin, Inspiration (Wide Hive 2004)
 Matt Slocum, Black Elk's Dream (Chandra, 2014)
 Paul Zarzyski, Collisions of Reckless Love (Open Path Music 2006)

References 

1978 births
American jazz composers
American male jazz composers
American jazz saxophonists
American male saxophonists
Berklee College of Music alumni
Living people
People from the San Francisco Bay Area
21st-century American saxophonists
21st-century American male musicians
Sunnyside Records artists
Criss Cross Jazz artists